The 1989 Wellington City mayoral election was part of the New Zealand local elections held that same year. In 1989, elections were held for the Mayor of Wellington plus other local government positions including twenty-one city councillors. The polling was conducted using the standard first-past-the-post electoral method.

Background

The 1989 local elections were the first following a major overhaul of local government in New Zealand. The existing Wellington City Council remained in place but greatly expanded, absorbing several of the neighboring authorities including the Tawa Borough Council and land on the waterfront formerly in the possession of the Wellington Harbour Board.

The race for the mayoralty was bitterly fought with both sides of local politics in Wellington fighting internal divisions as well as each other. Mayor Jim Belich stood for a second term opposed by his former deputy Helene Ritchie who had left Labour after she was removed as deputy-mayor the previous year. The Citizens' Association also had rival candidates running against each other with Rex Nicholls running as the officially endorsed candidate with former Citizens' leader on the council David Bull and ex-councillor Roger Ridley-Smith running as an independent candidates after losing the nomination to Nicholls. As such, the race was characterised by vote splitting and provided a very closely spread result.

The council vote was likewise indecisive with no one group having control of the council. The Labour Party had lost its majority from three years earlier with the Citizens' Association winning a plurality and becoming the largest group on the council. 1989 also saw the emergence of the Green Party which won a seat on the council, the first third party to do so since 1977. Stephen Rainbow won a seat in the Lambton Ward and became the country's first ever Green councillor.

Mayoralty results
The following table gives the election results:

Results by ward
Rex Nicholls polled the highest in three of the seven of Wellington's electoral wards while Jim Belich and Helene Ritchie each polled the highest in two.

Ward results

Candidates were also elected from wards to the Wellington City Council.

References

Mayoral elections in Wellington
1989 elections in New Zealand
Politics of the Wellington Region